Lando is both a masculine Italian given name and a surname. Notable people with the name include:

Historical figures
Pope Lando, Roman Catholic Pope from 913 to 914
Lando, a 7th Century Bishop of Rheims
Lando, a 13th-century archbishop of Messina
Lando of Capua, name of several Italian rulers
Lando I of Capua (died 861), Count of Capua from 843 to 861
Lando II of Capua, Count of Capua for six months in 861
Lando III of Capua (died 885), Count of Capua from 882 to 885
Lando IV of Capua, Prince of Capua from 1091 to 1098

Given name
Lando Bartolini (born 1937), Italian tenor
Lando Buzzanca (1935–2022), Italian actor
Lando Ferretti (1895–1977), Italian journalist and politician 
Lando Fiorini (born 1938), Italian actor and singer
Lando Norris (born 1999), British racing driver
Lando Vannata (born 1992), American professional mixed martial artist 
Philippe Lando Rossignol (died 2004), soukous recording artist and vocalist from Congo

Surname
Barry Lando (born 1939), Canadian award-winning journalist
Dov Lando (born 1930), Israeli rabbi
Joe Lando (born 1961), American actor
Peter Lando, set decorator 
Pietro Lando (1462–1545), Doge of Venice from 1538 to 1545
Teta Lando (1948–2008), Angolan musician

Nickname
Gabriel Landeskog (born 1992), Swedish ice hockey player sometimes nicknamed Lando
Landoald "Lando" Ndasingwa (died 1994), Rwandan politician

Fictional characters
Landonis Balthazar "Lando" Calrissian III, fictional character in Star Wars better known as Lando Calrissian
Mathilda Lando, fictional character played by Natalie Portman in Léon: The Professional

Italian masculine given names